Janakipuram is a village in Chandrugonda  mandal, Khammam district, Telangana, India.

Villages in Khammam district